This is a list of the commissioners of the Bechuanaland Protectorate, which gained full independence as Botswana in 1966. From 1885 to 1891 the post was known as Deputy Commissioner; from 1891 to 1964 as Resident Commissioner; and from 1964 to independence as Queen's Commissioner.

In the table below, dates in italics indicate de facto continuation of office.

{| class="wikitable"
|- align=left
!No
! width="18%"|Tenure
! width="40%"|Name
! width="20%"|Notes
|-
|
|colspan="3"|British Suzerainty
|- valign=top
|
|colspan="3"|Bechuanaland Protectorate
|- valign=top bgcolor="#ffffec"
|
|||John Mackenzie, || 
|- valign=top bgcolor="#ffffec"
|
||| Charles Warren, ||
|- valign=top bgcolor="#ffffec"
|
||| Frederick Carrington, ||
|- valign=top
|
|colspan="3"|(30 September 1885 to 16 November 1885) Divided into British Bechuanaland Crown Colony (south) and Bechuanaland Protectorate (north)
|- valign=top
|
|colspan="3"|British Bechuanaland Crown Colony
|- valign=top bgcolor="#ffffec"
|
||| Frederick Carrington, ||
|- valign=top
|- valign=top bgcolor="#ffffec"
|
|||Sidney Godolphin Alexander Shippard, ||
|- valign=top
|
|colspan="3"|Bechuanaland Protectorate
|- valign=top bgcolor="#ffffec"
|
|||Sidney Godolphin Alexander Shippard, ||
|- valign=top bgcolor="#ffffec"
|- valign=top
|
|colspan="3"|Bechuanaland High Commission Territory
|- valign=top bgcolor="#ffffec"
|
||| Sidney Godolphin Alexander Shippard, || 
|- valign=top
|
|colspan="3"|Under the High Commissioner for Southern Africa to 3 October 1963
|- valign=top bgcolor="#ffffec"
|
|||Francis James Newton, || 
|- valign=top bgcolor="#ffffec"
|
|||Hamilton John Goold-Adams, || 
|- valign=top bgcolor="#ffffec"
|
||| Ralph Champneys Williams, || 
|- valign=top bgcolor="#ffffec"
|
|||Francis William Panzera, || 
|- valign=top bgcolor="#ffffec"
|
|||Edward Charles Frederick Garraway, || 
|- valign=top bgcolor="#ffffec"
|
|||James Comyn Macgregor, || 
|- valign=top bgcolor="#ffffec"
|
|||Jules Ellenberger, || 
|- valign=top bgcolor="#ffffec"
|
|||Rowland Mortimer Daniel, || 
|- valign=top bgcolor="#ffffec"
|
|||Charles Fernand Rey, || 
|- valign=top bgcolor="#ffffec"
|
|||Charles Noble Arden-Clarke, || 
|- valign=top bgcolor="#ffffec"
|
|||Aubrey Denzil Forsyth-Thompson, || 
|- valign=top bgcolor="#ffffec"
|
|||Anthony Sillery, || 
|- valign=top bgcolor="#ffffec"
|
|||Edward Betham Beetham, || 
|- valign="top" bgcolor="#ffffec"
|
|||Martin Osterfield Wray, || 
|- valign="top" bgcolor="#ffffec"
|
|||William Forbes Mackenzie, || 
|- valign=top bgcolor="#ffffec"
|
|||John Redcliffe Maud,  || 
|-
|
|30 September 1960
|Independence Day  Republic of Botswana
|
|- valign="top" bgcolor="#ffffec"
|
|||Peter Fawcus, || 
|- valign="top" bgcolor="#ffffec"
|
|{{small|3 October 1963 to 1 August 1964}}||Peter Fawcus, ||
|- valign=top bgcolor="#ffffec"
|- valign=top
|
|colspan="3"|Bechuanaland
|- valign=top bgcolor="#ffffec"
|
||| Peter Fawcus,  || 
|- valign=top bgcolor="#ffffec"
|- valign=top
|
|Bechuanaland||colspan="2"|Self-Rule|- valign=top bgcolor="#ffffec"
|
||| Peter Fawcus,  || 
|- valign=top bgcolor="#ffffec"
|
|||Hugh Selby Norman-Walker, ||
|- valign=top
|
|30 September 1966||colspan="2"|Independence Day Republic of Botswana|}

For continuation after independence see: Heads of State of Botswana

Sources
 http://www.rulers.org/rulb1.html#botswana
 African States and Rulers, John Stewart, McFarland Heads of State and Government, 2nd Edition, John V da Graca, MacMillan Press 2000 Whitaker's Almanack 1965, J. Whitaker and Sons Ltd''

See also
High Commissioner for Southern Africa
Botswana
Heads of state of Botswana
Heads of government of Botswana
Vice-Presidents of Botswana
Lists of Incumbents

References

Bechuanaland Protectorate
Government of Botswana
Colonial heads
List